The spouse of the prime minister of Thailand is the wife or husband of the prime minister of Thailand.

The spouse of the current prime minister is associate professor Naraporn Chan-o-cha.

List

Gallery

See also 
 List of prime ministers of Thailand

References

Thailand
Lists related to prime ministers of Thailand